Guilherme Cavalcante de Melo (25 June 1952 – 21 April 2021) was a Brazilian politician, businessman, and lawyer. He served as Governor of Piauí, Vice-Governor of Piauí, and was a member of the Legislative Assembly of Piauí.

Biography
He earned a degree in business from the University Center of Brasília and began working at Banco do Brasil the Central Bank of Brazil. He became an advisor to the Empresa Brasileira de Assistência Técnica e Extensão Rural and the Chamber of Deputies. He then earned a degree in law from the Federal University of Piauí in 1984.

In , he was chosen to run as Vice-Governor of Piauí alongside , who became Governor. Melo became governor in 1994 when Neto resigned to seek a seat on the Brazilian Senate.[7] He left the Governorship the following year after he declined to seek re-election. In 2006, he ran for a seat on the Legislative Assembly of Piauí as a member of the Democratic Labour Party, but was unsuccessful.

Guilherme Melo died from brain cancer in Teresina on 21 April 2021, at the age of 68.

References

1952 births
2021 deaths
Governors of Piauí
Vice Governors of Piauí
Members of the Legislative Assembly of Piauí
Democratic Social Party politicians
Reform Progressive Party politicians
Progressistas politicians
Democratic Labour Party (Brazil) politicians
Brazilian Democratic Movement politicians
People from Teresina